My Diet Pill is a rock band from Nice, France. They have released three albums and three EPs to date. Since the very beginning, the band members do everything by themselves, including recording and booking shows. 
My Diet Pill's popularity is bigger outside of their native country of France and, thanks to the web, they have a growing number of fans all around the world. They have played more than 500 gigs in Europe and sold over 8000 copies of their second album. 

Vlad Andrijasevic and D'argirolle write most of the lyrics and music, the arrangements are done by the band.

Current line-up 
 Vlad - vocals, guitar, keyboards, trumpet, melodica and screwdriver.
 D'argirolle - vocals, guitar, harmonica and keyboards.
 Rj - vocals, bass and harmonica.
 Alex - drums and Roland MC-303.

Fans 
When peer-to-peer become a popular way to download music in mid-2000s, My Diet Pill fans used unusual promotional techniques: they included copies of the band's songs inside archives of other bands' music that are distributed on file sharing networks such as eMule.  This had the advantage of giving them targeted exposure to fans of similar bands, and downloaders were likely to give this free music a chance even if they'd never heard of the band. This gave My Diet Pill unexpected popularity which resulted in a raise of album sales, merchandising and the creation of fan-clubs (in Argentina and France).

Songs for your Daughters and Sons 
The band's third album was released on 12 September 2015, 10 years after the previous LP and 6 years after the last release. The reasons for that long hiatus are unclear. The album was produced by the iconic rock musician Monte Vallier, former bass player in San Francisco's cult bands Swell and Half Church. In May 2014, the band organized a contest and 25 fans were selected to choose what songs from the 15 that were recorded would be on the album. In January 2015, a crowd funding campaign was launched to release the album in the form of a package including a vinyl record, a CD, a download coupon and a booklet including pictures by French photographer Roxane Petitier.

Discography 
 Giraf EP (1997)
 First Album (1999)
 French EP (2005)
 Second Album (2005)
 Beautiful Girls Like Science-Fiction (2009) (5-track EP plus 10 remixes. Includes a 20-pages color comic book.)
 Songs for your Daughters and Sons (2015)

External links 
 Official homepage
 My Diet Pill albums on Bandcamp
 Guitar Tabs
 My Diet Pill on Facebook
 My Diet Pill on Twitter
 My Diet pill on Last.fm

Musical groups from Provence-Alpes-Côte d'Azur